Frameries is a municipality of Wallonia located in the province of Hainaut, Belgium.

The municipality consists of the following districts: Eugies, Frameries, La Bouverie, Noirchain, and Sars-la-Bruyère.

Sport 
Frameries is home to Rugby Union club RC Frameries who currently play in the Belgian Elite League and hosts the finish of the Grand Prix Pino Cerami cycling race.

Personalities
 Eugène Boch, painter and friend of Vincent van Gogh
 Auguste Toubeau, trade unionist

Twin towns 
 La Chaux-de-Fonds, Switzerland
 Issy-les-Moulineaux, France
 Willmar, Minnesota, USA

Image gallery

References

External links 
 
 Official website 
 Rugby Club Frameries 
 Football Club in Frameries 

Municipalities of Hainaut (province)
Belgium geography articles needing translation from French Wikipedia